The Loggia dei Mercanti ("Merchants' Lodge") is a historical palace in Ancona, central Italy.

The palace was begun in 1442 by architect Giovanni Pace, also known as Sodo, in an economically flourishing period for Ancona. It was built near the port, which was the trade point of the mercantile republic in medieval times, in order to provide a meeting point for the traders. The building was restored in 1558-1561 after a fire, under the direction of Pellegrino Tibaldi, who also frescoed the central hall.

The current façade was designed by the Dalmatian architect Giorgio da Sebenico, who worked to it in 1451 to 1459. It is divided into four vertical sections, topped by a pinnacle. Each one has a statue, representing (from left), Hope, Fortitude, Justice and Charity. The two side sections have two stained glass, ogival windows. In the upper sectors are blind double mullioned windows and, in the centre, is an equestrian statue of the Roman emperor Trajan.

The Loggia was damaged by the Allied bombings during World War II, and was restored in the late 20th century.

Sources

Houses completed in 1459
Buildings and structures in Ancona
Palaces in Marche
Gothic architecture in le Marche
Loggias in Italy